Xylophanes mirabilis is a moth of the  family Sphingidae. It is known from Colombia.

Description 
The wingspan is about 95 mm. It cannot be confused with any other Xylophanes
Species, although it is superficially similar in shape and pattern to Xylophanes ploetzi. It is much larger and the ground colour is deep green (slightly fading to yellowish) with pale purple-grey irroration and a solid black discal spot. The pale median band is highlighted along the basal edge with small black spots on the veins.

Biology 
The larvae probably feed on Rubiaceae and Malvaceae species.

References

mirabilis
Moths described in 1927
Endemic fauna of Colombia
Moths of South America